The 2008–09 season was Associazione Sportiva Roma's 76th season in Serie A. The club competed in four competitions; domestically, Roma finished a disappointing 6th, after three consecutive second-place finishes. They began the season by losing the Supercoppa Italiana to Inter, who also eliminated Roma in the quarter-finals of the Coppa Italia.

Having finished 2nd the previous season, Roma qualified automatically to the group stage of the 2008–09 UEFA Champions League. Roma managed to finish top of their group, but were eliminated in the round of 16 by English club Arsenal in a penalty shoot-out.

Club

Coaching staff

Players

Squad information
Last updated on 31 May 2009
Appearances include league matches only

Transfers

In

Out

Competitions

Overall

Last updated: 31 May 2009

Supercoppa Italiana

Serie A

League table

Results summary

Results by round

Matches

Coppa Italia

UEFA Champions League

Group stage

Knockout phase

Round of 16

Statistics

Appearances and goals

|-
! colspan=14 style="background:#B21B1C; color:#FFD700; text-align:center"| Goalkeepers

|-
! colspan=14 style="background:#B21B1C; color:#FFD700; text-align:center"| Defenders

|-
! colspan=14 style="background:#B21B1C; color:#FFD700; text-align:center"| Midfielders

|-
! colspan=14 style="background:#B21B1C; color:#FFD700; text-align:center"| Forwards

|-
! colspan=14 style="background:#B21B1C; color:#FFD700; text-align:center"| Players transferred out during the season

Goalscorers

Last updated: 31 May 2009

Clean sheets

Last updated: 31 May 2009

Disciplinary record

Last updated:

References

A.S. Roma seasons
Roma